The D.I.C.E. Award for Outstanding Achievement in Animation is an award presented annually by the Academy of Interactive Arts & Sciences during the academy's annual D.I.C.E. Awards. "This award is presented to the individual or team whose work represents the highest level of achievement in bringing a character or characters to life. This award will consider the fluidity of movement, and interaction with the environment in addition to contextual realism (look and feel)." The award was first presented at the 3rd Annual Interactive Achievement Awards in 2000. The winner was Final Fantasy VIII from SquareSoft.

The award's most recent winner was God of War Ragnarök, developed by Santa Monica Studio and published by Sony Interactive Entertainment.

Winners and nominees

2000s

2010s

2020s

Multiple nominations and wins

Developers and publishers 
Sony has published the most nominees and winners. It also has the most nominees for a single year, with three. Sony also published winners for three consecutive years. Sony's development subsidiary Naughty Dog has developed the most winners. However, Ubisoft Montreal has developed the most nominees, and is one of two developers with back-to-back wins, with the other being SquareSoft. Ubisoft Montpellier, formerly known as "Ubi Pictures", has developed the most nominees without having a single winner. Activision has published the most nominees without a single winner.

Franchises 
Assassin's Creed has been the most nominated franchise so far, while Uncharted and God of War have been the top winning franchises. Final Fantasy is the only franchise to have back-to-back wins. Call of Duty is currently the most nominated franchise that has never won.

Notes

References 

D.I.C.E. Awards
Awards established in 2000